Greatest Hits is the second compilation album by American boy band NSYNC. Released on October 25, 2005, the album debuted at #47 on the Billboard 200 albums chart. It didn't chart in the UK on release, but debuted at #96 on the UK Albums Chart dated September 7, 2013 in the wake of NSYNC's brief reunion performance at the 2013 MTV Video Music Awards. It features hits like "Bye Bye Bye", "It's Gonna Be Me", "I Want You Back", "Tearin' Up My Heart" and "Pop". This album also marks the third and final overall release under Jive Records. According to Nielsen SoundScan, it has sold 528,000 copies in the US alone as of February 2018.
Greatest Hits reached Silver certification status in United Kingdom in 2018. The album has sold 603,097 copies worldwide so far.

Track listing

Production
Compilation Mastered by Chaz Harper at Battery Mastering, NYC
Art Direction: Jackie Murphy & Jeff Gilligan
Design: Jeff Gilligan
Photography: Mark Seliger

Weekly charts

Certifications and sales

References

NSYNC albums
2005 greatest hits albums
Albums produced by Richard Marx
2005 video albums
Music video compilation albums
Jive Records compilation albums
Jive Records video albums